This is a list of the grade I listed buildings in the City of Bradford. In the United Kingdom, the term listed building refers to a building or other structure officially designated as being of special architectural, historical or cultural significance; Grade I structures are those on account of their special architectural or historic interest. In England, the authority for listing under the Planning (Listed Buildings and Conservation Areas) Act 1990 rests with English Heritage, a non-departmental public body sponsored by the Department for Culture, Media and Sport.

The city of Bradford is a metropolitan borough in West Yorkshire, England, established by the Local Government Act 1972. It covers a number of other outlying towns and villages, which had previously been covered by separate municipal borough, urban and rural district councils. The buildings are listed according to their individual towns, with Bradford having the most listed buildings, with a total of seven. Ilkley has four, with one of those being three stones outside All Saints Parish Church. Keighley has three listed buildings, Addingham has two, and Bingley and Shipley each have one.

Addingham

Bingley

Bradford

Ilkley

Keighley

Shipley

See also
Conservation in the United Kingdom

References

Buildings and structures in the City of Bradford
Grade I listed buildings in West Yorkshire
Lists of Grade I listed buildings in West Yorkshire